Alibi is a 1955 West German crime drama film directed by Alfred Weidenmann and starring O.E. Hasse, Martin Held and Hardy Krüger.

It was shot at the Tempelhof Studios in West Berlin and on location in Hamburg. The film's sets were designed by the art director Rolf Zehetbauer.

Cast
 O.E. Hasse as Peter Hansen
 Martin Held as Dr. Kurt Overbeck
 Hardy Krüger as Harald Meinhardt
 Eva Ingeborg Scholz as Inge Römer 
 Gisela von Collande as Frau Hansen
 Charles Regnier as Dietmar, Chef vom Dienst
 Peer Schmidt as Benjamin Roland
 Ernst Waldow a sKriminalkommissar Lukkas
 Siegfried Schürenberg as Vorsitzender des Gerichts
 Helga Roloff as Fräulein Dr. Klausen
 Jan Hendriks as Berthold
 Almut Rothweiler as Frau Overbeck
 Franz Essel as Staatsanwalt
 Hermann Holve as Verteidiger
 Hans-Albert Martens as Strafverteidiger
 Helmuth Rudolph as Chefredakteur von Pleskau
 Walter Werner as Vater Meinhardt
 Maria Sebaldt as Fräulein Krüger, Moderedakteurin
 Maly Delschaft as Frau Wilke
 Alexa von Porembsky as Hausangestellte Maria
 Arno Paulsen as Taxifahrer
 Walter Tarrach as Dr. Fischer
 Alexander Hunzinger as Ausrufer
 Fany Spornitz as Frau Dr. Brandt
 Alfred Maack as Kaufmann Beermann
 Ludwig Linkmann as Lokalredakteur Becker

References

Bibliography 
 Julia Bernhard & Sylvia Rebbelmund. O.E. Hasse. Stiftung Archiv der Akademie der Künste, 2003.

External links 
 

1955 films
West German films
German crime drama films
1955 crime drama films
1950s German-language films
Films directed by Alfred Weidenmann
Films shot at Tempelhof Studios
Films shot in Hamburg
German black-and-white films
1950s German films